Cero en Historia is a Spanish comedy panel show presented by Joaquín Reyes with Silvia Abril, Raúl Cimas, Sara Escudero and J.J. Vaquero as panelists.

In the first season, Javier Cansado, Elvira Lindo, Santi Millán and Juanma López Iturriaga made guest appearances. In the third season Javier Cansado, Nieves Concostrina, Alaska, Cayetana Guillén Cuervo, Fernando Colomo, Llum Barrera, Leticia Dolera, Montserrat Domínguez and Carles Sans made guest appearances.

In the season 3 episode 14 Silvia Abril was replaced by Anabel Alonso due to health problems.

The fourth season was aired on 12 September 2018. Dani Rovira, Ernesto Sevilla, Andreu Buenafuente, Susanna Griso, Roberto Leal, Toni Acosta and Javier Gurruchaga, between others, made guest appearances.

The fifth season aired on 27 February 2019. Aitana Sánchez-Gijón, Ana Morgade, Miren Ibarguren, Gemma Nierga, Blanca Portillo, Ángel Martín, Juan Manuel de Prada, Nieves Concostrina and Javier Coronas will make guest appearances. Patricia Conde replaced Silvia Abril.

In the seventh season Sara Escudero was replaced by Susi Caramelo. Javier Cansado, Nieves Concostrina, Dafne Fernández, Javier Botet, María Escoté, Javier Coronas and América Valenzuela will be the contestants. It will be added a new section called "Del dicho al trecho" in order to know the origins of proverbs.

It last aired on 28 December 2021.

References

External links
 

2017 Spanish television seasons
Spanish game shows
Spanish satirical television shows
Cero (TV channel) original programming